Ksenia Ivanovna Monko (born 8 February 1992) is a former competitive ice dancer for Russia. Alongside Kirill Khaliavin, she is the 2011 World Junior champion, a two-time (2009–10, 2010–11) Junior Grand Prix Final champion, and the 2015 Russian national silver medalist.

Personal life 
Ksenia Ivanovna Monko was born 8 February 1992 in Kirov, Kirov Oblast. She is the younger sister of Russian ice dancer Maria Monko. Ksenia married Kirill Khaliavin on 10 June 2017 in Kirov, Russia. Their son was born in October of 2020.

In February of 2022, following the Russian invasion of Ukraine, Monko and her family relocated indefinitely to Spain.

Career

Early career 
Ksenia Monko began skating at age four and switched to ice dance early, at age five. Her first coach was Svetlana Tamrieva.

Monko teamed up with Khaliavin in 2000. They trained in Kirov before problems with ice time led them to move to Rostov in 2005. They relocated with their coach to Moscow in May 2009.

During the 2009–10 season, they won the Junior Grand Prix Final and the Russian Junior title. They took the bronze at the 2010 World Junior Championships.

During the 2010–11 season, Monko/Khaliavin won their second JGP Final title, and followed that up with their second Russian Junior title. They won gold at the 2011 World Junior Championships.

Senior career 
Monko/Khaliavin moved up to the senior level for the 2011–12 season. They were assigned to compete at 2011 Skate America and 2011 Cup of China as their Grand Prix events but Khaliavin fell ill with mononucleosis in September. They withdrew from both Grand Prix events but returned to competition at the Russian Championships where they finished 5th.

In February 2012, Monko/Khaliavin switched coaches to Alexander Zhulin and Oleg Volkov. They finished 6th at the 2012 Rostelecom Cup and 4th at the 2013 Russian Championships. They joined the Russian team to the 2013 World Team Trophy, replacing Ekaterina Bobrova / Dmitri Soloviev who withdrew due to injury. Monko/Khaliavin finished 3rd at the event and Team Russia finished 4th overall. The duo withdrew from the exhibitions after Khaliavin developed an infection resulting in a high fever.

In the 2013–14 season, Monko/Khaliavin won silver at the 2013 Nebelhorn Trophy, behind Americans Madison Hubbell / Zachary Donohue, and then bronze at the 2013 International Cup of Nice. Their Grand Prix results were sixth at the 2013 Trophée Eric Bompard and fifth at the 2013 Rostelecom Cup. After placing fifth at the 2014 Russian Championships, they were not selected for the Olympics.

For the 2014–15 Grand Prix season, Monko/Khaliavin placed fourth at 2014 Skate Canada International and second at 2014 NHK Trophy. They went on to place second at the 2015 Russian Championships. They finished 10th at the 2015 European Championships and eighth at the 2015 World Championships.

For the 2015–16 Grand Prix, Monko/Khaliavin started their season by finishing fourth at 2015 Skate Canada International, they withdrew from their second assignment at the 2015 Rostelecom Cup due to Monko's injury. In 2016, she retired from competition due to the injury.

Programs 
With Khaliavin

Competitive highlights 
GP: Grand Prix; JGP: Junior Grand Prix

With Khaliavin

References

External links 

 

Russian female ice dancers
1992 births
Living people
Sportspeople from Kirov, Kirov Oblast
World Junior Figure Skating Championships medalists
Competitors at the 2013 Winter Universiade